Hernâni Ferreira da Silva (1 September 1931 –  5 April 2001) was a Portuguese football player who played almost his entire career at FC Porto. He was born in Águeda, Portugal and was chosen by  Portuguese sports newspaper Record as one of the best 100 Portuguese football players ever.

Hernâni made 28 appearances for the Portugal national football team from 1953 to 1964.

Honours
Porto
Primeira Liga (2): 1955–56, 1958–59
Taça de Portugal (2): 1955–56, 1957–58

References

External links 
 
 

1931 births
2001 deaths
People from Águeda
FC Porto players
Portuguese footballers
Portugal international footballers
Association football midfielders
Sportspeople from Aveiro District